A screwball is a baseball and fastpitch softball pitch that is thrown so as to break in the opposite direction of a slider or curveball. Depending on the pitcher's arm angle, the ball may also have a sinking action. The pitch is sometimes known as the scroogie or airbender.

Carl Hubbell was one of the most renowned screwball pitchers in the history of Major League Baseball. Hubbell was known as the "scroogie king" for his mastery of the pitch and the frequency with which he threw it. Other famous screwball artists include Tug McGraw, inaugural Hall of Fame member Christy Matthewson, and Cy Young Award winners Mike Cuellar, Fernando Valenzuela, Mike Marshall, and Willie Hernández.

Grip and action

The baseball is held with the open end of the horseshoe shape (where the seams are closest together) facing upward. The thumb is placed just beneath the bottom of the horseshoe, the index finger is curled against the top of the thumb, forming a tight circle to the side of the ball. The middle finger is then placed on the top of the ball and grips against the top seam, (the seam closest to the index finger).  The ring finger is placed outside the other top seam loosely and the pinky is held on the side opposite the thumb; all fingers are spread apart.  The grip is similar to the circle changeup, but with different placement in regards to the seams.

Also, unlike the Circle change, when throwing the screwball the middle finger applies the most pressure to the baseball, while the ring and pinky exert no pressure at all. For left-handed pitchers, as the middle finger presses hard down on the ball, their hand pronates (turns) inwardly in a clockwise manner near the end of the pitching motion, until much of the hand is beneath the ball. Conversely, right-handed pitchers turn their hand counter-clockwise.

Effects 
When thrown by a right-handed pitcher, a screwball breaks from left to right from the point of view of the pitcher; the pitch therefore moves down and in on a right-handed batter and down and away from a left-handed batter. When thrown by a left-handed pitcher, a screwball breaks from right to left, moving down and in on a left-handed batter and down and away from a right-handed batter. Due to this left-to-right movement of the ball (when thrown by a right-handed pitcher), right-handed pitchers use a screwball against left-handed batters in the same way that they use a slider against right-handed batters. If thrown correctly, the screwball breaks in the opposite direction of a curveball.

Notable screwball pitchers 
One of the first great screwball pitchers was Christy Mathewson, who pitched for the New York Giants 1900–1916, whose pitch was then labeled as the "fadeaway"; although historians have been unable to prove it, baseball legend holds that Giants manager John McGraw arranged for Black pitcher Rube Foster to teach Mathewson the screwball, as McGraw was forbidden from hiring Foster directly. Major league pitchers who have thrown the screwball during their careers include:

 Jen-Lei Liao
 Carl Hubbell
 Cy Blanton
 Luis Arroyo
 Jack Baldschun
 Bobby Castillo (taught the pitch to Valenzuela)
 Mike Cuellar
 Warren Spahn (in the second half of his career)
 Jim Brewer
 Rich Folkers
 John Franco
 Nelson Potter
 Clark Griffith
 Mel Parnell
 Mike Norris
 Juan Marichal
 Rubén Gómez
 Mike Marshall
 Masanori Murakami
 Fernando Valenzuela
 Teddy Higuera
 Tom Browning
 Tug McGraw
 Willie Hernández
 Jim Mecir
 Pedro Martínez
 Christy Mathewson
 Daniel Ray Herrera
 Dallas Braden
 Yoshinori Tateyama
 Hector Santiago
 Paul Byrd
 Yu Darvish
 Oliver Drake
  Devin Williams

Contrary to popular belief, the screwball is not particularly stressful on a pitcher's arm. The pronation of the forearm allows for the protection of the ulnar collateral ligament, which is replaced during Tommy John surgery.

References

Baseball pitches